The Journal of Urban Health is a bimonthly peer-reviewed public health journal which serves as a vehicle for publishing articles relevant to urban health including the broader determinants of health and health inequities. It was established in 1851 as the Transactions of the New York Academy of Medicine, and was renamed the Bulletin of the New York Academy of Medicine in 1925. It obtained its current name in 1998. Its parent organization is the New York Academy of Medicine (NYAM). The journal is published by Springer Science+Business Media along with NYAM. The editor-in-chief is David Vlahov (Yale School of Nursing). According to the Journal Citation Reports, the journal has a 2021 impact factor of 5.801.

References

External links

Epidemiology journals
Springer Science+Business Media academic journals
English-language journals
Bimonthly journals
Publications established in 1851
Public health journals
Academic journals associated with learned and professional societies of the United States